Royce Pierreson (born 1 April 1989) is a British actor and narrator. Royce is best known for his roles as DC Jamie Desford in the fourth series of Line of Duty and as Reece in Murdered by My Boyfriend. 

He has since appeared as Dr Jamie Cole in Our Girl (2016), Jason Hales in Wanderlust (2018), Burt Rhodes in Judy (2019), Istredd in The Witcher (2019–present), and Doctor John Watson in The Irregulars (2021).

Early life 
Pierreson was born and grew up in Saltash, Cornwall. He studied drama for three years at City College Plymouth, In 2011, he graduated from the Royal Welsh College of Music & Drama.

Career 
In 2014, Pierreson appeared in the television film Murdered by My Boyfriend. In 2016, he appeared as Jamie Cole in the television show Our Girl. 

In 2017, Pierreson appeared as AC-12 officer Jamie Desford in the fourth season of Line of Duty.

In December 2022, Pierreson appeared as fitness instructor Miguel in I Am... Ruth alongside Kate Winslet.

In addition to work in film and on the television, Pierreson has had roles in many theatre productions. He was in a 2012 production of Scarberia at the Theatre Royal in York, a 2013 production of Blair's Children at the Cockpit Theatre in Marylebone, and a 2015 production of Patrick Marber's Three Days in the Country at the Lyttelton Theatre in London.

Personal life
Pierreson married Natalie Herron on 5 July 2022 at Polhawn Fort, having met in 2017 at a festival in Budapest. They are based between London and Stockholm.

Filmography

Film

Television

Video Games

Theatre 
 2012: Scarberia, Theatre Royal
 2013: Blair's Children, Cockpit Theatre
 2015: Three Days in the Country, Lyttelton Theatre
 2017: Julius Caesar, Crucible Theatre

References

External links
 
 

Living people
British male television actors
1989 births
Black British male actors
British male stage actors
British male film actors
British male video game actors
British male voice actors
21st-century British male actors
Male actors from Cornwall
People from Saltash